Fazañas was a customary law system used in the County of Castile, similar to the ones used in Principality of Catalonia, Kingdom of Aragón and Kingdom of Valencia during the Middle Ages.

References

Law of Spain
History of Castile